The 2010 IRB Junior World Rugby Trophy was the third time that the event run in this second-tier world championship for Under 20 national teams. The event was organised by rugby's governing body, the International Rugby Board (IRB). This competition, which contested by eight men's junior national teams and was held in Moscow, Russia from May 18 to May 30.

Venues

Pools

Pool A

{| class="wikitable" style="text-align: center;"
|-
!width="200"|Team
!width="20"|Pld
!width="20"|W
!width="20"|D
!width="20"|L
!width="20"|TF
!width="20"|PF
!width="20"|PA
!width="25"|+/-
!width="20"|BP
!width="20"|Pts
|-
|align=left| 
| 3 || 3 || 0 || 0 || 17 || 120 || 19 || +101 || 2 || 14
|-
|align=left| 
| 3 || 2 || 0 || 1 || 8 || 70 || 54 || +24 || 1 || 9
|-
|align=left| 
| 3 || 1 || 0 || 2 || 5 || 66 || 45 || +21 || 3 || 7
|-
|align=left| 
| 3 || 0 || 0 || 3 || 4 || 26 || 164 || −138 || 0 || 0
|}Source

All match times are Moscow Time (UTC+3).

Pool B

{| class="wikitable" style="text-align: center;"
|-
!width="200"|Team
!width="20"|Pld
!width="20"|W
!width="20"|D
!width="20"|L
!width="20"|TF
!width="20"|PF
!width="20"|PA
!width="25"|+/-
!width="20"|BP
!width="20"|Pts
|-
|align=left| 
| 3 || 2 || 1 || 0 || 11 || 89 || 54 || +35 || 1 || 11
|-
|align=left| 
| 3 || 2 || 0 || 1 || 9 || 55 || 65 || −10 || 0 || 8
|-
|align=left| 
| 3 || 1 || 0 || 2 || 5 || 54 || 61 || −7 || 1 || 5
|-
|align=left|  
| 3 || 0 || 1 || 2 || 3 || 45 || 63 || −18 || 1 || 3
|}Source

All match times are Moscow Time (UTC+3).

Playoffs

7th place play-off

5th place play-off

3rd place play-off

Final

See also
2010 IRB Junior World Championship

External links
2010 IRB Junior World Rugby Trophy website

2010
2010 rugby union tournaments for national teams
2010 in Russian rugby union
rugby union
International rugby union competitions hosted by Russia
May 2010 sports events in Europe
rugby union
rugby union